The Felton Public Library serves the residents of San Lorenzo Valley. Its  building is located next to the post office, at 6121 Gushee St. A  Nature Discovery Park extends out from its doors.

History

The Felton Public Library was located at 6299 Gushee St., in a  building that had originally been a church, the 
Felton Presbyterian Church, from 1956 to 2019.  The new Felton Public Library building, next to the Felton post office on Gushee Street, was scheduled to open in February 2020.

In November 2019, library operations at the former building were permanently closed.

The new library building, less than a quarter mile away, opened on February 22, 2020.

References

External links
 Santa Cruz Library, including its Felton Branch

Buildings and structures in Santa Cruz County, California
Libraries in California